The 2017 North Dakota State Bison football team represented North Dakota State University in the 2017 NCAA Division I FCS football season. They were led by fourth-year head coach Chris Klieman. The team played their 25th season in the Fargodome in Fargo, North Dakota as members of the Missouri Valley Football Conference. The Bison finished the season 14–1, 7–1 in MVFC play to win the MVFC championship for the seventh consecutive year. As a result, the Bison received the conference's automatic bid to the FCS Playoffs as the No. 2 seed. In the playoffs, they defeated San Diego, Wofford, and Sam Houston State to advance to the National Championship game. There they defeated James Madison  to win the school's sixth National Championship in seven years.  The September 30 game against Missouri State was the 700th victory since the team's founding in 1894.

Previous season 
The Bison finished the 2016 season 12–2, 7–1 in MVFC play to win a share of the MVFC championship for the sixth consecutive year. They received an at-large bid to the FCS Playoffs where they defeated San Diego and South Dakota State before losing to James Madison in the semifinals, ending their five-year championship run.

Schedule

Roster

Recruiting class

Coaching staff

Game summaries
Polls are based on the FCS STATS Poll

Mississippi Valley State

Box Score.

at Eastern Washington

Box Score.

Robert Morris

Box Score.

Missouri State

Box Score.

at Indiana State

Box Score.

at Youngstown State

Box Score.

Western Illinois

Box Score.

Northern Iowa

Box Score.

at South Dakota State

Box Score.

South Dakota

Box Score.

at Illinois State

Box Score.

FCS Playoffs

San Diego–Second Round

Box Score.

Wofford–Quarterfinals

Box Score.

Sam Houston State–Semifinals

Box Score.

James Madison–Championship

Box Score.

Ranking movements

References

North Dakota State
North Dakota State Bison football seasons
NCAA Division I Football Champions
Missouri Valley Football Conference champion seasons
North Dakota State
North Dakota State Bison football